Rajeev Govindan (Malayalam: രാജീവ്‌ ഗോവിന്ദൻ; born 2 October 1972), formerly known as Rajeev Nair is an Indian writer, lyricist and producer known for his works in the Malayalam film industry. He is a civil engineer by profession. His noted works include Ordinary and Trivandrum Lodge. His first production venture under the banner of Magic Moon Productions was Malayalam film Ordinary  directed by Sugeeth. His next production was the Prithviraj Sukumaran starring film Anarkali which was directed by Sachy (writer). He is also a regular member of ISA (Indian screenwriters association). Recently, he changed his name officially to Rajeev Govindan from Rajeev Nair.

Early career
A civil engineer by profession, he established an entrepreneurial venture, Hydrotech Systems Pvt. Ltd. in August 2009. The company specializes in ocean engineering and offshore engineering with an emphasis on underwater operations.

He began as a lyricist with devotional songs from 2003 . His early works include singer Biju Narayanan’s Lord Ayyapa devotional songs  "Makara Nilavu" which was released by HMV Audios. Another work was the devotional album Krishna Priyan.
He worked with music director P. K. Reghu Kumar on Varumo Vasantham (2008) brought out by Sathyam Audios. His teamwork with Iype Mathew,  Bibin Mathew Abraham & director Sugeeth for the Musical Video Album Keralam provided his entry into film production. He also wrote lyrics for the album Hare (2014), composed by Sreevalsan J Menon.

Film career

Lyricist
His career as a lyricist in the Malayalam Film Industry began with the film Race (2011). Though he had written for the Jayasurya starrer Vaadhyar (2012), his debut production venture Ordinary (2012) was released first. His work for the film remains the most noticed in his career.
His other work includes Trivandrum Lodge (2012), "Erunottam Ithenthinu Veruthe" from the movie Chettayees (2012), 3 Dots (2013) and the songs from the surprise hit Vellimoonga (2014). He also wrote the lyrics for Peruchazhi (2014), Picket 43 (2015), 100 days of Love, Haram (2015) and Careful (2017). His upcoming projects for 2018 are Kaaliyan  and Kinavallikal

Producer
His first production venture under the banner of Magic Moon Productions was the Malayalam film Ordinary (2012) directed by Sugeeth. The movie starring an ensemble cast including Kunchako Boban, Biju Menon and Ann Augustine was a success and one of the highest grossers of the year. The movie witnessed the upcoming of a new tourist destination Gavi, Pathanamthitta and the introduction of the new comic team of Kunchako Boban and Biju Menon. He produced the romantic movie Anarkali starring Prithviraj Sukumaran which was also the directorial debut of the writer Sachy.

Rajeev Govindan's (previously known as Rajeev Nair) poetry collection Thimirakanthi, published by D.C. Books was released on 5 November  2017.

Awards

 New Mumbai cultural center award for the best lyricist in various films in 2018.
Mumbai Tharangini Award, 2018 Best producer and lyricist for Anarkali.
 Eco Friendly Film Awards, 2013- Ordinary, Producer Rajeev Nair.
 Cinema Scapes, 2012- Ordinary, Award for Best feature film other than Hindi.

Filmography
As producer

As lyricist

References

External links
 
 Anarkali Promo Video "Ship Voyage ",https://www.youtube.com/watch?v=bi_hGeOCRQM

Writers from Kerala
Malayalam-language lyricists
Malayalam film producers
People from Malappuram district
Living people
Film producers from Kerala
1970 births